The Duchess of Teck may refer to:

 Margaret Cambridge, Marchioness of Cambridge (1873 –  1929), the sixth child and third daughter of the 1st Duke of Westminster and the wife of the 1st Marquess of Cambridge.
 Mary of Teck (1867 – 1953), Queen of the United Kingdom and the British Dominions, and Empress of India, from 1910 until 1936 as the wife of King-Emperor George V.
 Princess Mary Adelaide of Cambridge (1833 – 1897), a member of the British royal family.

Disambiguation pages